The second season of The Wonder Years aired on ABC from November 30, 1988, to May 16, 1989. It took place during Kevin Arnold's 1968–69 school year.

Episodes

 Fred Savage, Alley Mills and Josh Saviano were present for all episodes.
 Danica McKellar was absent for 9 episodes.
 Jason Hervey was absent for 4 episodes.
 Olivia d'Abo was absent for 3 episodes.
 Dan Lauria was absent for 1 episode.

References

1988 American television seasons
1989 American television seasons
The Wonder Years seasons
Television series set in 1968
Television series set in 1969